The Timor-Leste women's national under-20 football team, represents Timor-Leste is  a national women's association football youth team of Timor Leste and is controlled by the Federação de Futebol de Timor-Leste (FFTL).

Tournament Record

AFF U-19 Women's Championship record

Records

l

List of Coaches

References

Asian women's national under-20 association football teams
women u20